Inverted  ( "isolated " or  "inverted " or "" in Hebrew) is a rare glyph used in classical Hebrew. Its function in the ancient texts is disputed. It takes the form of the letter  in mirror image, and appears in the Masoretic text of the Tanakh in nine different places:
 Numbers - twice, 10:35–36: the two verses are delineated by inverted , sometimes isolated outside the passage text and sometimes embedded within words in verses 10:35 and 11:1.
 Psalms - seven times in chapter 107 (vs 20-25, vs 39)

The images at right show three common variants of the inverted  – vertically flipped, horizontally flipped, and Z-shaped. Other renderings exist, corresponding to alternative interpretations of the term "inverted". It may also occur with a dot above.

Occurrence and appearance 

Inverted  are found in nine passages of the Masoretic Text of the Bible. The exact shape varies between different manuscripts and printed editions. In many manuscripts, a reversed  is found, referred to as a "" by the Masoretes. In some earlier printed editions, they are shown as the standard  upside down or rotated, presumably because the printer did not want to design a new rare character. Recent scholarly editions of the Masoretic text show the reversed  as described by the Masoretes. In some manuscripts, however, other symbols are occasionally found instead. These are sometimes referred to in rabbinical literature as "simaniyot" (markers).

In the Torah, the inverted  frame the text:

The  are generally positioned close to, but not touching, the first and last words of the couplet. They are supposed to be positioned between the gaps in between the paragraphs, but there is disagreement as to how this should be done. Some texts invert the existing  in the Torah text and don't add inverted  before and after it.

Rashi's commentary states that the name of the city of Haran at the end of the Torah portion Noach also occurs with an inverted , but this is not found in existing texts.

Rabbinic basis 

The Babylonian Talmud records in the tractate Shabbath, folio 116a, that the markings surrounding Numbers 10:35–36 were thought to denote that this 85-letter text was not in its proper place. One opinion states that it would appear in another location which discusses the order of tribal column, with the position of the Ark already stated there.

It also suggests that the inverted  may suggest the Hebrew word  , meaning 'a light'.

The tractate Shabbat in the Talmud says regarding the inverted :

Sifrei explains these "signs":

The Talmud continues, stating that as this section is a separate book, the portions of Numbers before and after it also count as books and thus the Torah contains seven books in total:

Bar Kappara is known to have considered the Torah as composed of seven volumes in the Gemara "The seven pillars with which Wisdom built her house (Prov. 9:1) are the seven Books of Moses". Genesis, Exodus and Leviticus and Deuteronomy as we know them but Numbers was really three separate volumes: Num 1:1 to Num 10:35, followed by Numbers 10:35–36, and the third text from there to the end of Numbers. 

The Mishnah, in tractate Yadayim, states:

According to Midrash:

Rabbi Yechezkel Landau, however, defends the custom, stating that punctuation such as inverted  doesn't count as extra letters and thus don't invalidate the scroll.

Elsewhere 
Inverted  appears to have been used as a scribal or editorial annotation or text-critical mark.

The primary set of inverted  is found surrounding the text of Numbers 10:35–36. The Mishna notes that this text is 85 letters long and dotted. The demarcation of this text leads to the later use of the inverted  markings. Saul Lieberman demonstrated that similar markings can be found in ancient Greek texts where they are also used to denote 'short texts'. Greek sources, especially Alexandrian ones, refer to the sign as reversed sigma.

Unicode 
The inverted  is not part of any word, and is never pronounced; thus it is classed as punctuation and not a letter.

References 

Hebrew alphabet
Punctuation